Vanport may refer to:

Locations
Vanport, Oregon
Vanport Township, Beaver County, Pennsylvania
Companies
Vanport Manufacturing, a logging company